Harold Clement Mcgugin (November 22, 1893 – March 7, 1946) was a U.S. Representative from Kansas.

Born on a farm near Liberty, Kansas, McGugin attended the public schools of Liberty, Kansas. He moved to Coffeyville, Kansas, in 1908. He was graduated from the high school at Coffeyville in 1912, and from the law department of Washburn College, Topeka, Kansas, in 1915, and took a postgraduate course at the Inns of Court, London, England, in 1919.
He was admitted to the bar in 1915 and commenced practice in Coffeyville, Kansas. During the First World War served as a second lieutenant, Adjutant General's Department, at Brest, France. He served as member of the State house of representatives 1927-1929. City attorney of Coffeyville in 1929.

McGugin was elected as a Republican to the Seventy-second and Seventy-third Congresses (March 4, 1931 – January 3, 1935). He was an unsuccessful candidate for reelection in 1934 to the Seventy-fourth Congress and for election in 1936 to the Seventy-fifth Congress. He resumed the practice of law. Enlisted in the United States Army in 1942, advancing from captain to lieutenant colonel, and served in France, where he contracted an incurable disease. He died in the Army and Navy General Hospital at Hot Springs, Arkansas, March 7, 1946. He was interred in Restlawn Cemetery, Coffeyville, Kansas.

References

1893 births
1946 deaths
Republican Party members of the Kansas House of Representatives
United States Army officers
Republican Party members of the United States House of Representatives from Kansas
20th-century American politicians